The men's singlestick was a singlestick event held as part of the fencing at the 1904 Summer Olympics programme. It was the only time the event was held at the Olympics. Three fencers competed. The competition was held on Thursday, September 8, 1904.

Results

Final

References

 
 

Fencing at the 1904 Summer Olympics